Patti Stenhouse (born 24 September 1955) is a Canadian former swimmer who was Commonwealth champion in the 100 metre butterfly.

Stenhouse, a butterfly specialist, swam for the Ridge SC in Surrey, British Columbia, which was formed by her father Jim to train his three children. She is the elder sister of swimmer Janice Stenhouse, with whom she competed at the 1973 World Aquatics Championships in Belgrade.

At the 1974 British Commonwealth Games, held in Christchurch, Stenhouse won three medals for Canada, including gold in both the 100 metre butterfly and 4x100 medley relay. She set a national record in the 200m butterfly to finish with a silver medal.

References

External links

1955 births
Living people
Canadian female butterfly swimmers
Sportspeople from Surrey, British Columbia
Commonwealth Games medallists in swimming
Commonwealth Games gold medallists for Canada
Commonwealth Games silver medallists for Canada
Swimmers at the 1974 British Commonwealth Games
20th-century Canadian women
Medallists at the 1974 British Commonwealth Games